Maceo Brown (born September 1, 1995) is an American rugby union player. He plays for the United States national rugby sevens team as a center and as a forward.

Brown debuted for the U.S. national team at the 2018 Dubai Sevens. He played regularly as a substitute for the U.S. throughout the 2018–19 season – including at the 2019 USA Sevens tournament, which the U.S. won – in the absence of squad regular Maka Unufe, who was out for the season.

In his youth, Brown was a multi-sport athlete at Corona del Sol High School. He played American football and basketball, and started playing rugby at the age of 16. Brown attended college at Grand Canyon University where he played for the school's rugby team.

Brown was selected for the USA Eagles sevens squad for the 2022 Rugby World Cup Sevens in Cape Town.

References

American rugby union players
Living people
1995 births
Pan American Games medalists in rugby sevens
Pan American Games bronze medalists for the United States
Rugby sevens players at the 2019 Pan American Games
Medalists at the 2019 Pan American Games
Rugby sevens players at the 2020 Summer Olympics
Olympic rugby sevens players of the United States